Ludwig Troche (born 23 December 1935) is a German racing cyclist. He rode in the 1961 Tour de France.

References

External links
 

1935 births
Living people
German male cyclists
Place of birth missing (living people)
People from Hamelin
Cyclists from Lower Saxony